WLKO (102.9 FM, "The Lake") is a classic hits-leaning adult hits radio station serving the Charlotte, North Carolina area. Although licensed to Hickory, the main studios are located at 801 Woodridge Center Drive, just off the Billy Graham Parkway near Charlotte/Douglas International Airport, while its transmitter is located north of Stanley. The station recently began playing continuous Christmas music again for the first time since 2011, which was a staple of the station until that point.

WLKO broadcasts in the HD Radio format, licensed by the U.S. Federal Communications Commission as a digital (hybrid) station.

History
The station's history in Charlotte began on September 1, 1987, with a signal boost and a move from Hickory, North Carolina (where it was WHKY-FM). Prior to the move, "Y-102.9" had played Top 40 with a heavy emphasis on album-oriented rock, a format that made people notice at a time when rock radio was in decline.

WHKY-FM had aired Christian programming since 1959. Before the format change to Top 40 on October 16, 1982, WHKY-FM was playing primarily fundamentalist Baptist gospel and hymns and Southern gospel quartets such as The Blackwood Brothers and the Oak Ridge Quartet. A September 1982 survey showed WHKY-FM had all of the gospel audience in the area. Listeners were mostly over 55, and many of them protested the change with letters to the local newspaper, and a pile of letters to the station described as one foot high, 95 percent opposed. The Top 40 format targeted the 18 to 30 audience, which attracted many more advertisers.

WRLX, also known as "Relax 102.9", aired a beautiful music format. WRLX promoted itself with images of a pair of retirement-age punk rockers, intended to humorously illustrate how the competition apparently viewed the station's target audience. In March 1989, the station changed its call letters to WEZC (after the 104.7 frequency gave up those letters) and its name to "EZ 102.9", gradually adding more vocals during the summer to make the transition from beautiful music to MOR. Some of the early announcers include Bob Brandon, Jim Davenport, Catherine Lane, Jon Robinson and Todd Edwards.  In 1993, the name changed again to "Lite 102.9" as the station moved from Barbra Streisand, Neil Diamond and Barry Manilow to soft adult contemporary (Phil Collins, Elton John and Billy Joel), and the call letters switched to WLYT in 1995. Over the years, as the definition of soft adult contemporary changed, WLYT evolved. The station played pop and lite rock music from the 1970s to present, with an occasional 1960s song. Delilah After Dark aired in the evenings.

WLYT featured a "70's Flashback Weekend" every weekend since late 2004 through 2005, but discontinued this tradition after the slogan changed from "Continuous Lite Favorites" to "The Best Variety of Yesterday and Today". The station played Christmas music annually, with 'preview weekends' from early November through Thanksgiving, then a 24-hour Christmas format from Thanksgiving through Christmas Day.  WLYT's main competitor was CBS Radio's WKQC. WLYT had changed its slogan from The Best Variety of Yesterday and Today to The Bright New Sound of Lite 102.9 in 2011.

In late January 2008, WLYT changed its morning show to more closely resemble the Today show on NBC, with more talk geared toward women 25 to 54. During the first hour, the talk was more hard news, becoming lighter as the morning show progressed and adding more music during work hours.  The program schedule was altered as well. The show was discontinued in early 2010 with morning hosts Jim Shafer (who had moved to the station from WWMG in 2004) and Jen Byrum (morning host since 1999) being released. On April 13, 2010, Valentine in the Morning, a syndicated show from sister KBIG-FM in Los Angeles, made its debut. A local host was planned for local segments of the show.

On July 2, 2012, at midnight, WLYT changed its format to adult hits, branded as "102.9 The Lake". The final song on "Lite" was "Far Away" by Nickelback, while the first song on the "Lake" was "Father of Mine" by Everclear. Steve Geofferies, operations manager for the Charlotte cluster of station owner Clear Channel, said, "If it was a hit song, we’re going to play it," explaining that the format was based on WARH in St. Louis, and more "tempo-oriented" than nearby WSMW. The name "Lake" meant "fun, unique, connecting with friends and families. That’s life on the lake," specifically Lake Norman and Lake Wylie. The playlist was 4000 songs compared to 400 for a typical station. Also, the station would not have DJs, meaning morning host Heather Flynn and Phil Harris were let go. On July 9, 2012, WLYT changed its call letters to WLKO to go with the "Lake" branding.

The format change delivered immediate results. While WLYT ranked 15th with 3 percent share of the total audience in its final ratings report, WLKO was ranked 7th with five percent share in its first one. After two years, WLKO was up 52 percent to 4th place for the most successful format change in the market in 25 years.  As of 2016, the playlist primarily features hit music from the 1970s and 1980s, with occasional 1990s and 2000s music played; with this, the station more closely resembles a classic hits station than the adult hits format the station started out with, though the "We Play Anything" slogan is still promoted.

On September 16, 2014, WLKO's owners Clear Channel Communications officially changed their name to iHeartMedia.

Previous logo

References

External links

LKO
Radio stations established in 1959
1959 establishments in North Carolina
IHeartMedia radio stations